The Humanist Society of New Zealand (Inc.) is a New Zealand organisation that promotes secular humanist philosophy and ideals. The Society meets in Wellington with members throughout New Zealand.

It is affiliated internationally to the International Humanist and Ethical Union (IHEU) and the United Nations Association of NZ. The official symbol of the Society is a version of the Happy Human.

See also

New Zealand Association of Rationalists and Humanists
Atheist bus campaign (other countries)

References

External links
 Humanist Society of New Zealand

New Zealand
Skeptic organisations in New Zealand